1929 Országos Bajnokság I (men's water polo) was the 23rd water polo championship in Hungary. There were nine teams who played one round match for the title. It was the first time when teams from outside Budapest also participated in the championship. From this season it is called National Championship.

Final list 

* M: Matches W: Win D: Drawn L: Lost G+: Goals earned G-: Goals got P: Point

2. Class 

1. MUE 8, 2. Tatabányai SC 6, 3. Orosházi TK 4, 4. BSE 0(2), 5. Tatatóvárosi AC 0 pont. Penalty points are in brackets.

Sources 
Gyarmati Dezső: Aranykor (Hérodotosz Könyvkiadó és Értékesítő Bt., Budapest, 2002.)
Sport-évkönyv 1929

1929 in water polo
1929 in Hungarian sport
Seasons in Hungarian water polo competitions